Armen Der Kiureghian (October 4, 1947), is an Iranian-born Armenian-American academic, one of the founders of the American University of Armenia, where he served as the president from 2014 to 2019. 

He is the Professor of Civil Engineering at the University of California. 

Der Kiureghian was elected a member of the US National Academy of Engineering in 2011 for contributions to risk and reliability and earthquake engineering to advance the practice of civil and structural engineering. He is also a Foreign Member of the National Academy of Sciences of Armenia.

Biography 
Der Kiureghian was born in Isfahan in the family of prominent Armenian painter Sumbat Der Kiureghian. He received his BS and MS in Civil Engineering from the University of Tehran, Iran, and his PhD in Structural Engineering from the University of Illinois at Urbana-Champaign in 1975. In 1978 he joined the faculty at the University of California at Berkeley, where in 1978–1981 he was as assistant professor, and continued to be an Associate Professor (1981–1985), Professor (1985), Vice Chair (1990–1993) and Chair (1997–2001) of the Structural Engineering, Mechanics and Materials Program and as vice-chair for Instruction in the Department of Civil and Environmental Engineering. Since July 1999, he has held the Taisei Chair in Civil Engineering in the College of Engineering at UC Berkeley.

After the Spitak earthquake of 1988 in Armenia, Der Kiureghian played a leading role in establishing the American University of Armenia in Yerevan as an affiliate of the University of California. He served as the founding Dean of the College of Engineering (1991–2007) and as Interim Provost (2011–2012) of AUA concurrently with his position at Berkeley. He has also served as the founding Director of the Engineering Research Center of AUA (1991–2004), a has been founding member of the Board of Trustees of AUA. He served as interim president of the university since the departure of President Bruce Boghosian in July 2014. In January, Dr. Armen Der Kiureghian has accepted the position of president of AUA. In May 2019, he passed the baton to Dr. Karin Markides.

Armen Der Kiureghian's teaching and research interests are in the areas of structural reliability, risk analysis, random vibrations and earthquake engineering. He has pioneered methods for safety and reliability assessment of complex structures and for stochastic seismic analysis of buildings, bridges, and critical equipment. He has more than 300 publications, including more than 110 in archival journals and book chapters.

Armen Der Kiureghian is a member of a number of societies and associations including:
 Elected Member of the US National Academy of Engineering
 Elected Foreign Member of the National Academy of Engineering of Armenia, 1994
 Elected Foreign Member of the National Academy of Sciences of Armenia, 1998
 Alfred M. Freudenthal Medal from the Engineering Mechanics Division of ASCE
 George Winter Medal from the Structural Engineering Institute of ASCE
 Distinguished Alumnus of the Department of Civil and Environmental Engineering at University of Illinois at Urbana-Champaign, 2006
 Distinguished Alumnus, Faculty of Engineering, Tehran University, Iran, 2004
 Fulbright Distinguished Professor, University of Lubljana, Slovenia, 1989
 Mitsubishi Chair Visiting Professor, Tokyo University, Japan, 1989

Awards 
 Walter L. Huber Civil Engineering Research Prize, ASCE, 1989
 CERRA Award, Civil Engineering Risk and Reliability Association, 1999
 Movses Khorenatsi Medal, Government of Armenia, 2001
 Alfred M. Freudenthal Medal, Engineering Mechanics Division, ASCE, 2006
 Thomas A. Middlebrooks Award, Goe-Institute, ASCE, 2006
 2007 Best Paper Award, Journal of Computing in Civil Engineering, ASCE, 2008
 Distinguished Research Award, International Association for Structural Safety and Reliability, 2013
 George Winter Medal, Structural Engineering Institute, ASCE, 2014

Personal life 
Der Kiureghian has two children, Naira and Sebouh. He has been married to Nelly Ouzounian since 1983.

Painting as a hobby 
Der Kiureghian's main hobby is painting watercolors which he learned from his father, Sumbat, who was a professional artist and watercolorist. He paints landscapes and still life.

Books
 Der Kiureghian, A. (2009). The life and art of Sumbat. ADK & Associates Publishers, San Francisco, CA. 172 pages.

References

External links

 Official page
 Armen Der Kiureghian, University of California, Berkeley, Publications
 Armen Der Kiureghian

1947 births
Living people
Scientists from Isfahan
American educational theorists
American people of Armenian descent
Heads of universities and colleges in the United States
Iranian people of Armenian descent
Iranian emigrants to the United States
University of Tehran alumni
Members of the United States National Academy of Engineering